Helmut Dieser (born March 15, 1962 in Neuwied) is a German Roman Catholic bishop of the Roman Catholic Diocese of Aachen.

Life 
Dieser studied Roman Catholic theology and philosophy in Trier and Tübingen. On 8 July 1989 Dieser became priest. On 5 June 2011 Dieser became ordained titular bishop of Narona. Since 12 November 2016 Dieser is bishop of Aachen.

Positions 
In March 2019, Dieser said, exceptions from clerical celibacy in the Catholic Church should be allowed. In his opinion, there should be a reform of the Catholic sexual morality and sexual acts between homosexual partnerships no longer a sin in Roman Catholic catechism. In June 2020, Dieser said blessing of same-sex partnerships should be allowed in the Roman catholic church.

References

External links 
 Helmut Dieser on website by Bistum Aachen
 
 DomRadio.de: Aachener Bischof zeigt sich bestürzt über Kritik an Führungsstil (german)
 Aachener Zeitung.de: Aachens Bischof drängt auf Dialog, Konsens und Veränderung (german)
 Die Tagespost: Bischof Diester, Am Zölibat festhalten (german)

Roman Catholic bishops of Aachen
21st-century German Roman Catholic bishops
1962 births
Living people
21st-century Roman Catholic bishops in Germany